A list of American films released in 1928. The American film industry was undergoing the transition to sound and released a mixture of sound and silent films during the year.

Wings won the Academy Award for Outstanding Picture at the 1st Academy Awards, presented on May 16, 1929.

A-B

C-D

E-F

G-H

I-J

K-L

M-N

O-P

Q-R

S

T-U

V-Z

Shorts

See also
 1928 in American television
 1928 in the United States

References

External links

1928 films at the Internet Movie Database

1928
Film
Lists of 1928 films by country or language
1920s in American cinema